Showtime Live Shulin is a shopping mall in Shulin District, New Taipei City, Taiwan that opened on May 26, 2018. The main core stores of the mall include Showtime Cinemas, Uniqlo, Nitori, Muji and various themed restaurants.

History
 On June 17, 2015, Showtime Live Shulin held a groundbreaking ceremony.
 On May 26, 2018, Showtime Live Shulin officially opened.

Floor Guide

See also
 List of tourist attractions in Taiwan
 Showtime Live Taichung Wenxin
 Showtime Live Chiayi
 Showtime Live Taitung
 Showtime Live Taichung Station

References

External links

2018 establishments in Taiwan
Shopping malls in New Taipei
Shopping malls established in 2018